Sieraków Landscape Park (Sierakowski Park Krajobrazowy) is a protected area (Landscape Park) in west-central Poland.

The Park lies within Greater Poland Voivodeship, in the area around the town of Sieraków.

Landscape parks in Poland
Parks in Greater Poland Voivodeship